Hinterhornbach is a municipality in the district of Reutte in the Austrian state of Tyrol.

Geography
Hinterhornbach lies in the Hornbach valley, a side valley of the Lech watershed. It is situated at the foot of the Hochvogel in the Allgau Alps.

References

Cities and towns in Reutte District